On 1 March 1979 a by-election was held for the House of Commons constituency of Clitheroe in Lancashire.  It was won by the Conservative Party candidate David Waddington.

Vacancy 
The seat had become vacant when the Conservative Member of Parliament (MP), David Walder had died at the age of 49 on 26 October 1978. He had held the seat since the 1970 general election, having previously been MP for High Peak in Derbyshire.

Candidates 
The Conservative candidate was 49-year-old David Waddington, a barrister who had been MP for Nelson and Colne from 1968 until his defeat at the October 1974 general election. The Labour Party candidate was Lindsay Sutton, and the Liberals fielded Frank Wilson.

Result 
The result was a clear victory for Waddington, with a massively increased majority of 36.6% of the votes. The Labour vote fell by a few percent, but the Liberal share of the vote collapsed to 6.6% from its 20.8% high in October 1974.

Waddington held the seat until its abolition for the 1983 general election, when he was returned for the new Ribble Valley constituency. He went on to become Home Secretary and Leader of the House of Lords.

Votes

See also
Clitheroe constituency
The town of Clitheroe
List of United Kingdom by-elections

References 

1979 elections in the United Kingdom
1979 in England
March 1979 events in the United Kingdom
1970s in Lancashire
Clitheroe
Politics of Ribble Valley
By-elections to the Parliament of the United Kingdom in Lancashire constituencies